Coloncito is the capital city of Panamericano Municipality, in Táchira State, Venezuela. The municipality also contains the small town of La Palmita.

Cities in Táchira